William Edward Brophy (July 1, 1888 – after 1929) was a grocer and politician in Newfoundland. He represented St. John's East in the Newfoundland House of Assembly from 1927 to 1928.

The son of Edward Brophy, he was born in St. John's and was educated at St. Patrick's Hall. Brophy was elected to St. John's City Council as an alderman in 1925 and served until 1929. He was elected to the Newfoundland assembly in a 1927 by-election held after Nicholas Vinnicombe was named to the Board of Liquor Control.

In 1913, Brophy married Mollie Canning.

Brophy Lane and Brophy Place in St. John's were named in his honour.

References 

1888 births
Year of death missing
Members of the Newfoundland and Labrador House of Assembly
St. John's, Newfoundland and Labrador city councillors
Dominion of Newfoundland politicians